Paremhat 15 - Coptic Calendar - Paremhat 17

The sixteenth day of the Coptic month of Paremhat, the seventh month of the Coptic year. In common years, this day corresponds to March 12, of the Julian Calendar, and March 25, of the Gregorian Calendar. This day falls in the Coptic Season of Shemu, the season of the Harvest.

Commemorations

Saints 

 The departure of Pope Michael I, the 46th Patriarch of the See of Saint Mark

Other commemorations 

 The apparition of the Virgin Saint Mary in the Church of Saint Demiana in Papadouplo, Shoubra, Cairo, Egypt

References 

Days of the Coptic calendar